BeBopBeBopBeBopBeBop (sometimes simply referred to as BeBop) is an album of bebop standards by pianist Paul Bley recorded in Denmark in 1989 and released on the SteepleChase label.

Reception

Allmusic awarded the album 4 stars calling it "A surprising album from Bley, long considered an outside player with little, if any, affinity for straight bop. He shatters that myth on this set". The Penguin Guide to Jazz said "Bebop is a taxingly inventive and constantly surprising run through a dozen kenspeckle bop tunes".

Track listing
 "Now's the Time" (Charlie Parker) – 4:40   
 "My Little Suede Shoes" (Parker) – 7:47   
 "Ornithology" (Parker) – 7:06   
 "A Night in Tunisia" (Dizzy Gillespie) – 4:23   
 "Don't Blame Me" (Dorothy Fields, Jimmy McHugh) – 6:29 Bonus track on CD   
 "The Theme" (Traditional) – 7:35 Bonus track on CD   
 "Bebop" (Gillespie) – 2:38   
 "Lady Bird" (Tadd Dameron) – 6:32   
 "Tenderly" (Walter Gross, Jack Lawrence) – 4:37   
 "Steeplechase" (Parker) – 3:14   
 "Barbados" (Parker) – 3:52   
 "52nd Street Theme" (Thelonious Monk) – 3:41

Personnel 
Paul Bley – piano
Bob Cranshaw – bass 
Keith Copeland – drums

References 

1990 albums
Paul Bley albums
SteepleChase Records albums